Ali Maâloul (born 1 January 1990) is a Tunisian professional footballer who plays as a left-back for Al Ahly and the Tunisia national team.

Club career
Maâloul started his career with hometown club CS Sfaxien and became their captain from the 2014–15 season. In the 2015–16 season, he became the top scorer in the league with 14 goals in 20 matches, a record for a defender since none has scored more than nine goals in a season. At CS Sfaxien, he wore the number 10 shirt, which is unusual for his position.

On 25 July 2016, Maâloul signed a four-year contract with Al Ahly, becoming one of the Egyptian giants' key players on their way to conquering many tournaments.

International career
On 6 July 2013, Maâloul made his debut Tunisia in a 1–0 loss to Morocco in the 2014 African Nations Championship qualification phase. He also participated in two editions of the Africa Cup of Nations in 2015 and 2017. In the 2015 edition, he played four matches as Tunisia lost in the quarter-finals to hosts Equatorial Guinea in extra time. In the 2017 edition, he played three matches as Tunisia went out again in the quarter-finals, this time to Burkina Faso.

Maâloul also represented Tunisia at the 2016 African Nations Championship, playing three matches. Tunisia continued their quarter-final disappointment by losing to Mali. He also played two matches at the 2018 FIFA World Cup in Russia against England (2–1) and Belgium (5–2).

Career statistics

Club

International

Scores and results list Tunisia's goal tally first, score column indicates score after each Maâloul goal.

Honours and achievements
CS Sfaxien
 Tunisian Ligue Professionnelle 1: 2012–13
 CAF Confederation Cup: 2013
 North African Cup Winners Cup: 2009

Al Ahly
 Egyptian Premier League: 2016–17, 2017–18, 2018–19, 2019–20
 Egypt Cup: 2016–17, 2019–20
 Egyptian Super Cup: 2017–18, 2018–19, 2021–22
 CAF Champions League: 2019–20, 2020–21
 CAF Super Cup: 2021 (May), 2021 (December)

Individual
 Tunisian Ligue Professionnelle 1 top goalscorer: 2015–16
 CAF Team of the Year: 2017
 IFFHS Men’s CAF Team of The Year: 2020, 2021

References

External links

1990 births
Living people
People from Sfax
Association football defenders
Tunisian footballers
CS Sfaxien players
Tunisia international footballers
2015 Africa Cup of Nations players
2017 Africa Cup of Nations players
Al Ahly SC players
Tunisian expatriate footballers
Egyptian Premier League players
Tunisian Ligue Professionnelle 1 players
Expatriate footballers in Egypt
Tunisian expatriate sportspeople in Egypt
2018 FIFA World Cup players
2021 Africa Cup of Nations players
2016 African Nations Championship players
Tunisia A' international footballers
2022 FIFA World Cup players